A special election to determine the member of the United States House of Representatives for California's 5th congressional district was held on April 7, 1987, with a runoff held two months later on June 2.

Incumbent Representative Sala Burton, who herself was elected during a special election following the previous incumbent's death, died on February 1, 1987, from colon cancer. Her death triggered a special election, leading to multiple people running to finish her term. No candidate received a 50% election in the general, leading to a run-off which former California Democratic Party chair Nancy Pelosi won.

Candidates
Fourteen candidates ran for the special election.

Democratic Party

 Nancy Pelosi, former chairwoman of the California Democratic Party and daughter of former Baltimore mayor, Thomas D'Alesandro Jr.
 Harry Britt, LGBT rights advocate and former member of the San Francisco Board of Supervisors
 William Maher, San Francisco Board of Supervisors member
 Doris M. Ward, San Francisco Board of Supervisors member
 Carol Ruth Silver, gun rights advocate and San Francisco Board of Supervisors member
 Brian Lantz

Republican Party

 Harriet Ross
 Kevin W. Wadsworth
 Tom Spinosa, World War II and Vietnam War veteran and San Francisco County Republican Party official
 Mike Garza

Libertarian Party

 Sam Grove

Peace and Freedom Party

 Theodore Zurr

Independents

 Karen Edwards
 Catherine Renee Sedwick

Special primaries
The special election primaries were held on April 7, 1987. Every candidate ran in a nonpartisan blanket primary. If a candidate won 50% of the vote, they would automatically fill in the vacant seat. If no candidate won 50% of the vote, a runoff would be triggered with the top candidates in each party advancing to the runoff.

Runoff election
The runoff election took place on June 2, 1987, with Nancy Pelosi gaining the majority of the vote, winning her the special election for Burton's seat.

References

California 1987 05
California 1987 05
1987 05 Special
California 05 Special
United States House of Representatives 05 Special
United States House of Representatives 1987 05
California's 5th congressional district special election
California's 5th congressional district special election
Nancy Pelosi